The term diamond exchange typically refers to a place where diamonds are exchanged.

Notable instances include:

Israel Diamond Exchange, the diamond exchange center of Israel
Diamond Exchange District, a diamond district in the Israeli city of Ramat Gan

Other
The Diamond Exchange, a professional wrestling stable led by wrestler Diamond Dallas Page in the American Wrestling Association

See also
World Federation of Diamond Bourses